Martin Dobelle (December 25, 1906 - August 11, 1986) was an American surgeon.

Early life and education
Born in New York City December 25, 1906, the son of Harry and Ida Kaplan Dobelle, he grew up in Brooklyn, New York. An alumnus of Boys High School, he received a track and field scholarship to and graduated from Fordham University in 1926 where he was a member of Phi Beta Kappa. After working in a Brooklyn pharmacy for two years, he studied medicine at the University of Ghent in Belgium, where he received his M.D. degree in 1932.  As an intern and resident, he served in various American hospitals, including Boston City Hospital, at which time he held teaching fellowships at both Tufts University and Harvard University.  Later he became one of the first doctors in this country to successfully develop an artificial hip joint.

Career
Dr. Dobelle came to Pittsfield in 1939, opening offices in the Onota Building.  He was affiliated with Hillcrest, Fairview and North Adams Regional hospitals, as well as the House of Mercy, later Pittsfield General Hospital, and St. Luke's Hospital, the last two of which were later merged to become Berkshire Medical Center.

In 1943 he closed his private practice and entered the Army as a first lieutenant.  He left nearly four years later as a lieutenant colonel, having served as chief of orthopedic surgery at the Army hospital in Fort Belvoir, Virginia, and chief of surgery service at Halloran General Hospital in Staten Island.  He was cited for meritorious performance while at Fort Belvoir, where he reorganized the orthopedic section and set up a teaching program, and was decorated three times for surgical accomplishment.

He was named civilian orthopedic consultant to the Veterans Administration, a post he held for 20 years, and to the office of the surgeon general, the Federal Security Commission, and U.S. Department of Labor.  Dr. Dobelle returned to Pittsfield in 1947.  He moved in 1955 to 769 North Street, a house he converted to contain offices for six doctors, acting as his own architect and contractor.

He spent much of his life working with crippled children.  He was chief of surgery at the Carrie Tingly Crippled Children's Hospital for Indian Children in Hot Springs, New Mexico, and consulting orthopedic surgeon for Kaiser Permanente Foundation Hospital in Honolulu, Hawaii.  He also served as chief orthopedic surgeon at the Cape Kennedy Missile Center in Florida for three years during Project Mercury and was consultant in orthopedic surgery to the Air Force Military Support Facility at Patrick Air Force Base.

He returned to Pittsfield in 1965 and two years later was appointed medical examiner for central Berkshire, a post he held until 1982.  He was also a five-year member of the state Board of Registration in Nursing.

Family
His wife of 43 years, Lillian Mendelsohn Dobelle, died in 1979. A graduate of the former Paterson State Teachers College, New Jersey, she earned a  master's degree in History from NYU and was a certified high school principal. The couple often wintered in Florida, where Dr. Dobelle  also had a  medical practice and was Chief of Staff of the Monroe-Jackson Hospital, which he built in Hollywood, Florida in 1956.  Upon his passing, he left two sons, William H. Dobelle and Evan Dobelle, and four grandchildren.

Memberships
Dr. Dobelle was president of the Nicholas Andre Orthopedic Society, a diplomate of the American Board of Orthopedists, a fellow of the New York Academy of Medicine, and a founding fellow of the International College of Surgeons, as well as a member of the American Medical Association and Massachusetts and Berkshire medical societies.  He retired from the practice of medicine in 1975.

A former president of Temple Anshe Amunim, he was a member of the American Legion, and Crescent Lodge of Masons and the Shriner Melha Temple in Springfield, Massachusetts from which he received his 50-year pin in 1983.  He was given a gold medal by the International Ladies Garment Workers Union for 50 years of service and interest in the labor movement.

References
The Berkshire Eagle

1906 births
1986 deaths
American orthopedic surgeons
Fordham University alumni
Harvard University people
Tufts University faculty
Ghent University alumni
20th-century American physicians
Boys High School (Brooklyn) alumni
20th-century surgeons